Yulia Andreyevna Zykova (born 25 November 1995) is a Russian sport shooter. She participated at the 2018 ISSF World Shooting Championships, winning a bronze medal. At the 2020 Summer Olympics, taking place in Tokyo in 2021, Zykova qualified to the finals with the best score, and finished second in the final, taking home a silver medal.

References

External links

Living people
1995 births
Russian female sport shooters
ISSF rifle shooters
Sportspeople from Krasnoyarsk
European Games gold medalists for Russia
Shooters at the 2019 European Games
European Games medalists in shooting
Shooters at the 2020 Summer Olympics
Medalists at the 2020 Summer Olympics
Olympic silver medalists for the Russian Olympic Committee athletes
Olympic medalists in shooting
21st-century Russian women